Finn Manni Kieding Thofte (born 28 June 1953 in Högdalen) is a Swedish former alpine skier who competed in the 1972 Winter Olympics.

References

1953 births
Swedish male alpine skiers
Alpine skiers at the 1972 Winter Olympics
Olympic alpine skiers of Sweden
Sportspeople from Stockholm
Living people
20th-century Swedish people